Tripleurospermum subpolare is a species of flowering plant belonging to the family Asteraceae.

Its native range is Northern and Northeastern Europe to the northern Russian Far East.

References

Anthemideae